On May 9, 2015, the city of San Antonio, Texas, held an election to choose the next Mayor of San Antonio. Interim mayor Ivy Taylor ran for election to a full term and narrowly defeated former state senator Leticia Van de Putte in the runoff election on June 13, 2015, to become the first African American elected to the position.

Background
Julian Castro, who was first elected mayor in the 2009 mayoral election, was selected in 2014 to become the next United States Secretary of Housing and Urban Development. Upon that announcement, State Representative Mike Villarreal immediately announced he would run to succeed Castro in the 2015 election. Once Castro was confirmed by the U.S. Senate, the San Antonio City Council selected Ivy Taylor as interim mayor by a third-round unanimous vote becoming the city's first African-American mayor.

In November 2014, after losing the race to become Lieutenant Governor of Texas, outgoing State Senator Leticia Van de Putte announced she would run for mayor despite earlier reports saying she would not seek the position. Additionally, in spite of earlier promises that Taylor would not run for a full term in the May election, she ultimately entered the race in February 2015.

Candidates
After the deadline to file passed, four candidates (Adkisson, Taylor, Van de Putte and Villarreal) were considered the frontrunners in the race, though none of them were able to poll above fifty percent and avoid a runoff.

Declared
 Tommy Adkisson, former Bexar County Commissioner
 Cynthia Brehm
 Cynthia Cavazos
 Douglas Emmett
 Michael Idrogo
 Paul Martinez, retired Army major
 Pogo Mochello Reese
 Julie Iris Oldham, perennial candidate
 Gerard Ponce, former Bexar County Court Coordinator and 2014 Republican candidate for Bexar County Judge
 Rhett Smith, perennial candidate and Green Party activist
 Ivy Taylor, Mayor of San Antonio and former city councilwoman
 Leticia Van de Putte, former state senator and Democratic nominee for Lieutenant Governor of Texas in 2014
 Mike Villarreal, former state representative
 Raymond Zavala, community organizer and previous mayoral candidate

Endorsements
italicized individuals and organizations are post-regular election endorsements

Polling

Results

First round 

On May 9, 2015, the election for mayor was held. None of the leading candidates received more than 50% of the vote and as a result, a runoff election was scheduled for Saturday, June 13, 2015, between the top two vote getters. 

 
 
 
 
 
 
 
 
 

 
 
* Vote percentage include all of Bexar County with a total of 12,316 either voting in another municipal election or casting no ballot for San Antonio mayor.

Runoff 
More people voted in the runoff election for mayor than did in the regular election on May 9, 2015. Taylor found most of her support from conservatives within the city who typically reside on the north side and from her former city council district on the east side. Meanwhile, Van de Putte performed best on the west and south sides of town.

References

21st century in San Antonio
2015 Texas elections
2015 United States mayoral elections
2015
Non-partisan elections